James Morgan may refer to:

Military
 W. James Morgan (died 1866), Union Army recruiter and officer in the American Civil War
 James D. Morgan (1810–1896), American Civil War general in the Union Army
 James H. Morgan (Medal of Honor) (1840–1877), American Civil War Medal of Honor recipient

Politics

U.S.
 James Morgan (congressman) (1756–1822), U.S. Representative from New Jersey
 James B. Morgan (1833–1892), U.S. Representative from Mississippi
 James G. Morgan (1885–1964), Missouri state senator
 James H. Morgan (politician), member of the California State Assembly 1861–1862 
 Jim Morgan (American politician) (born 1937), member of the West Virginia House of Delegates
 James W. Morgan (1891–1971), mayor of Birmingham, Alabama 1953–1961

Elsewhere
 Sir James Morgan, 4th Baronet (1643–1718), Welsh baronet
 James Morgan (MP) (c. 1660–1717), British Member of Parliament for Weobley and Hereford
 James Morgan (Queensland politician) (1816–1878), Member of the Queensland Legislative Assembly
 James Morgan (New South Wales politician) (1853–1933), New South Wales politician
 Jim Morgan (Canadian politician) (1939–2019), politician in Newfoundland

Sports
 Jimmy Morgan (footballer, born 1912) (1912–1944), Scottish footballer, Hamilton Academical
 Jimmy Morgan (William James Morgan, 1922–1976), English footballer, Bristol Rovers
 Jim Morgan (Australian rules footballer) (1924–1995), Australian rules footballer
 Jim Morgan (bowls) (born 1933), Welsh international lawn bowler
 Jim Morgan (basketball) (1934–2019), American basketball player and race horse trainer
 Jim Morgan (rugby league) (1943–2005), Australian rugby league footballer
 James Morgan (bobsledder) (1948–1981), American who competed from mid 1970s to early 1980s
 James Morgan (American football) (born 1997), American football quarterback

Other
 James Morgan (engineer) (1776–1856), British architect and engineer
 James N. Morgan (1918–2018), American economist and educator
 James Morgan (journalist) (1938–2002), BBC World Service economics correspondent
 James J. Morgan (born 1942), American executive and former CEO of Atari and Philip Morris USA
 James Morgan (actor) (born 1985), British actor
 James Morgan (conductor), British conductor and composer
 James Morgan (set designer), scenic artist and producing artistic director of the York Theatre